Waitaki Girls' High School is a state high school for girls situated in Oamaru, on the East coast of New Zealand. It was founded in 1887 on the initiative of local parliamentarians, Samuel Shrimski and Thomas William Hislop, and presently has a roll of just over 400 girls from the ages of 13 to 18.  It also has a boarding hostel which houses approximately 50 girls, including international students and tutors.

The school uses a house system with four houses and accompanying colours: Burn (red), Ferguson (yellow), Gibson (green) and Wilson (blue). These houses were named after the first four principals of the school: Margaret Burn, Catherine Ferguson, Mary Gibson and Jessie Wilson. Competitions between the houses, such as athletics, swimming, choir and drama, are held annually.

The school motto is Dulcius Ex Arduis, which in Latin means "satisfaction from hard work".

Curriculum 
Waitaki Girls' High School uses National Certificate of Educational Achievement (NCEA) based assessments. A strong emphasis is placed on gaining good marks, with "Excellence Awards" being awarded annually to girls who achieve high marks in their internal and external assessments.

Subjects taught include English, mathematics (statistics and calculus), sciences (chemistry, biology, physics, agriculture), languages (Japanese, German, Maori), classics, computer studies, Geography, History, Physical Education and Art (Painting, Photography, Art History).

Principals
Since its establishment in 1887, Waitaki Girls' High School has had 10 principals. The following is a complete list:

Notable alumnae 
Anne Taylor former president of Netball New Zealand and World Netball.
Isabel Clark - killed in World War I in the sinking of the British troopship SS Marquette
Janet Frame - New Zealand author

References

External links

 School website
 Ministry of Education page

Girls' schools in New Zealand
Secondary schools in Otago
Buildings and structures in Oamaru
Educational institutions established in 1887
Boarding schools in New Zealand
1887 establishments in New Zealand
Alliance of Girls' Schools Australasia